This Olympic Games results index is a list of links to articles containing results of each Olympic sport at the Summer Olympics and Winter Olympics. Years not appearing are those when the event was not held. Years in italics mean it was a demonstration sport.

Summer Olympics
The Summer Olympics was cancelled in 1916 because of World War I, and in 1940 and 1944 because of World War II.

Archery

Athletics

Badminton

Baseball

Basketball

Basque pelota

Beach volleyball

Boxing

Canoeing and kayaking

Cricket

Croquet

Cycling

Diving

Equestrian

Fencing

Figure skating

Figure skating appeared in the Summer Olympics twice, in 1908 and 1920. It became an established event of the Winter Olympics in 1924 (see below).

Football (soccer)

Otherwise known as association football, this event made its debut at the Olympics of 1900 and has appeared in every Olympic games since then except for 1932, after the introduction of the FIFA World Cup in 1930.

Golf

Gymnastics

Handball

Hockey (field)

Ice hockey

Ice hockey appeared only once in the Summer Olympics. It became part of the Winter Olympics from 1924 onwards (see below).

Jeu de paume

Judo

Lacrosse

Modern pentathlon

Polo

Rackets

Roque

Rowing

Rugby union

The event was rugby union until 1924 and rugby sevens since 2016.

Sailing

Shooting

Softball

Swimming

Synchronized swimming

Table tennis

Despite its worldwide popularity, table tennis did not appear in the Olympics until 1988.

Taekwondo

Tennis

Triathlon

Tug of war

Volleyball

Water motorsports

Water polo

Weightlifting

Wrestling

Winter Olympics
The Winter Olympics was cancelled in 1940 and 1944 because of World War II.

Alpine skiing

Bandy

Biathlon

Bobsleigh

Cross-country skiing

Curling

Figure skating (including ice dancing from 1976)

Figure skating appeared twice in the Summer Olympics, in 1908 and 1920 (see above).

Freestyle skiing

Ice hockey

Ice hockey appeared once in the Summer Olympics, in 1920 (see above).

Luge

Nordic combined

Short track speed skating

Skeleton

Ski jumping

Snowboarding

Speed skating

See also
 Paralympic results index